Andy Nwakalor  is a Nollywood film director.

Life
Nwakalor was the director of Rising Moon (2005). The  movie won several Africa Movie Academy Awards, and Nwakalor won the Award for Best Director.

Nwakalor was also screenwriter for Emeka H. Umeasor's 2008 movie "Sins of Rachael". In 2010 he was among the Nigerian music and movie artistes declaring their support for Goodluck Jonathan in the 2011 Nigerian presidential election. He is the supervising director of The Unveiled Truth, a Christian soap opera which started in 2017.

Filmography
 Rising Moon, 2005

References

Year of birth missing (living people)
Living people
Nigerian film directors